Bistorta officinalis (synonym Persicaria bistorta), known as bistort, common bistort, European bistort or meadow bistort, is a species of flowering plant in the dock family Polygonaceae native to Europe and northern and western Asia. Other common names include snakeroot, snake-root, snakeweed and Easter-ledges.

Description

It has a thick, twisted rootstock which has probably given it its common name of snakeroot. The foliage is normally basal with a few smaller leaves produced near the lower end of the flowering stems. The leaves usually hairless; the basal ones are longish-oval with long winged stalks and rounded or heart-shaped bases; the upper ones are few and are triangular, tapered and stalkless. There are stipules at their base which are fused into a sheath surrounding the stem. The petioles are broadly winged. The inflorescence is a spike. The individual flowers are pink with five perianth segments, eight stamens, three fused carpels and three free styles. The fruit is a glossy black nut. Flowering takes place in June and July. The plant grows in moist soils and under dry conditions goes dormant, losing its foliage until adequate moisture exists again.

Taxonomy 

The generic placement of this species was historically in flux, having been placed in Polygonum or Persicaria but is now accepted as Bistorta.

Etymology 

The Latin name bistorta, from bis ("twice") + torta ("twisted"), refers to the twisted appearance of the root.

Numerous other vernacular names have been recorded for the species in historical texts, though none is used to any extent. Many of the following refer to the plant's use in making puddings:

Distribution and habitat 

Bistort is a native of Europe but is often cultivated and has become naturalized in other parts of the world such as in the United States in New England. It is typically found growing in moist meadows, nutrient-rich wooded swamps, forest edges, wetlands, parks, gardens and disturbed ground.

Cultivation
This species is grown as an ornamental garden plant, especially the form 'Superba' which has larger, more showy flowers, and has gained the Royal Horticultural Society's Award of Garden Merit. It is suitable for use as a marginal or in bog gardens. Bistort has been cultivated as a vegetable, its roots, leaves and young shoots being steamed or boiled. Many of its occurrences in the wild may be as a garden escape.

Uses
It has also been used traditionally for medicinal purposes. The roots are rich in tannic and gallic acids and both these and the leaves have been used to treat wounds.

In Northern England the plant was used to make a bitter pudding in Lent from a combination of the leaves, oatmeal, egg and other herbs. It is the principal ingredient of dock pudding or Easter-Ledge pudding. The root of Bistort can be used to produce an astringent that was used in medicine. The roots are also eaten in Russia and northern Asia.

Gallery

References

Bibliography 

 

Edible plants
Flora of Europe
Perennial plants
officinalis
Plants described in 1753
Taxa named by Carl Linnaeus